William Emerson Brock III (November 23, 1930 – March 25, 2021) was an American Republican politician who served in both chambers of the United States Congress from 1963 to 1977 and later in the United States Cabinet from 1981 to 1987. He was the grandson of William Emerson Brock Sr., a Democratic U.S. senator who represented Tennessee from 1929 to 1931.

Early life and career
Brock was a native of Chattanooga, where his family owned a well-known candy company. He was the son of Myra (Kruesi) and William Emerson Brock Jr. Brock was a 1949 graduate of McCallie School and a 1953 graduate of Washington and Lee University in Lexington, Virginia, in 1953 and subsequently served in the U.S. Navy until 1956. He then worked in his family's candy business. Brock had been reared as a Democrat, but became a Republican in the 1950s. In 1962, he was elected to Congress from Tennessee's 3rd congressional district, based in Chattanooga. The 3rd had long been the only Democratic outpost in traditionally heavily Republican East Tennessee; indeed, Brock's victory ended 40 years of Democratic control in the district.

Underlining this district's conservative bent, Brock was reelected in 1964 by over nine points amid Lyndon Johnson's 44-state landslide. He was again re-elected in 1966 and 1968. During Brock's tenure in the House, he voted in favor of the Civil Rights Act of 1968, but voted against the Civil Rights Act of 1964 and the Voting Rights Act of 1965.

United States Senator
Brock served four terms in the House and then won the Republican nomination to face three-term incumbent U.S. Sen. Albert Gore Sr. in 1970, defeating country singer Tex Ritter in the primary. Brock's campaign was successfully able to make an issue of Gore's friendship with the Kennedy family and Gore's voting record, which was somewhat liberal by Southern standards, and defeated him.

While in the Senate, Brock was a darling of the conservative movement but was less popular at home; his personality was somewhat distant by the standards of most politicians. As a freshman U.S. senator he accomplished a great deal even as a minority Republican. He was the original author of the Congressional Budget Act (S. 3984, 92nd Congress and S. 40, 93rd Congress) and as ranking minority of Committee on Government Operations, Subcommittee on Budgeting, Management, and Expenditures led the crafting of the Congressional Budget Bill. He sponsored credit legislation (Title V - Equal Credit Opportunity, H.R. 11211, 93rd Congress), memorialized by a U.S. National Archives exhibit, that provides woman's access to credit, including credit cards, by requiring financial institutions and other firms engaged in the extension of credit to make credit equally available to all and not to discriminate on the "basis of sex or marital status". He was co-chair of the Stevenson/Brock Committee (S. Res. 109, Temporary Select Committee to Study the Senate Committee System) with Senator Adlai Stevenson III, which sponsored establishment of the U.S. Senate Energy Committee as well as workload, scheduling, and staffing reforms and importantly reorganization of committee jurisdictions. As a member of Senate Finance Committee he promoted upgrading unemployment benefits, review of cash and non-cash benefits for low income, analysis of negative income tax experiments, transparency of markups, amendments to tax code, and introduced the first Senate tax indexing bill. Brock was a member of Paperwork Commission which according to Science's "Commission on Paperwork" editorial (September 23, 1977) issued 25 reports and 750 recommendations for cutting paperwork saving $3.5 million annually. And he drafted a 1975 resolution providing personal committee staffing for junior members (S. Res 60). In all these, he worked closely with a broad coalition of Democrats and Republicans to bring those with widely ranging views together. This was appreciated by professional committee staff and members. His efforts contributed greatly to Congress' "Era of Cooperation" between 1971 and 1977, during which major reforms were accomplished including the Clean Water Act of 1972, Endangered Species Act of 1973, Safe Drinking Water Act of 1974, and Congressional Budget and Impoundment Control Act of 1974, all of which passed without opposition votes in the Senate.

He was considered vulnerable in the 1976 election cycle and several prominent Democrats ran in the 1976 Democratic Senate primary for the right to challenge him. The most prominent and best-known name, at least initially, was probably 1970 gubernatorial nominee John Jay Hooker; somewhat surprisingly to most observers, the winner of the primary was Jim Sasser, who had managed Albert Gore Sr.'s 1970 reelection campaign.

Sasser was able to exploit lingering resentment of the Watergate scandal, which had concluded only about two years earlier. However his most effective campaign strategy was to emphasize how the affluent Brock, through skillful use of the tax code by his accountants, had been able to pay less than $2,000 in income taxes the previous year; an amount considerably less than that paid by many Tennesseans of far more modest means. Sasser was also aided by the popularity of Democratic presidential candidate Jimmy Carter in Tennessee as the former Georgia Governor would win the state by a double-digit margin. Although he started with a 30-point lead in polls over Sasser, Brock would lose his re-election bid by a 47%–52% margin.

Prior to his Senate re-election run, Brock was among those considered to replace Nelson Rockefeller as President Gerald Ford's running mate in the 1976 election.

Post Senate career

After leaving the Senate, Brock became the new chairman of the Republican National Committee, a position he held from 1977 to 1981. Upon the election of Ronald Reagan as U.S. president, Brock was appointed U.S. Trade Representative, a position he maintained until 1985, when he was made Secretary of Labor.

Brock resigned his cabinet post in late 1987 to serve as the campaign manager for Senator Bob Dole's presidential campaign. Dole, the runner up to Vice President George Bush, was seen as a micro-manager who needed a strong personality like Brock to guide his campaign. Brock's late start in the Fall of 1987 left little time to help find an avenue to cut into Bush's substantial lead in national polls. Additionally, many viewed Brock as an imperious and inadequate manager who badly misspent campaign funds- largely on national headquarters staff- leaving Dole without adequate money for a Super Tuesday media buy. Dole and Brock had a public falling out, and Brock publicly fired two of Dole's favored consultants, ordering them off of the campaign plane. Dole dropped out of the race in late March 1988 after losing key primaries in New Hampshire, the South, and Illinois. Brock became a consultant in the Washington, D.C., area. By this point, he had become a legal resident of Maryland. In 1994 he won the Republican U.S. Senate primary in Maryland over future convict Ruthann Aron, but was soundly defeated (41%–59%) in the general election by Democratic incumbent Paul Sarbanes.

In 1990, Brock was awarded the New Zealand 1990 Commemoration Medal. Brock was a member of the ReFormers Caucus of Issue One.

Personal life
Brock married Laura Handly in 1957. They had four children and remained married until her death from cancer in 1985. He later married Sandra Schubert.
 
Brock died from pneumonia in Fort Lauderdale, Florida, on March 25, 2021, at age 90.

References

External links

 
 USDOL biography
 e-archive biography
 William Emerson Brock III Papers , University of Tennessee Knoxville Libraries
 

1930 births
2021 deaths
20th-century American businesspeople
20th-century American politicians
American Presbyterians
Businesspeople in confectionery
Candidates in the 1994 United States elections
Deaths from pneumonia in Florida
Maryland Republicans
Military personnel from Tennessee
Politicians from Annapolis, Maryland
Politicians from Chattanooga, Tennessee
Presbyterians from Tennessee
Reagan administration cabinet members
Republican National Committee chairs
Republican Party United States senators from Tennessee
Republican Party members of the United States House of Representatives from Tennessee
United States Navy sailors
United States Secretaries of Labor
United States Trade Representatives
Washington and Lee University alumni
Members of Congress who became lobbyists